Adam Quick (born 1 September 1981) is an Australian professional basketball player, formally of the Australian National Basketball League (NBL).

Quick played for the Nunawading Spectres as a junior before attending the University of Portland in the United States for four years, before returning to Australia to play for the Townsville Crocodiles for two years.  He had a successful debut season for the Crocs, however, tore his Achilles tendon before his second season, and was sidelined.

Looking to move back to Melbourne after getting married, he requested permission to talk to debut franchise the South Dragons.  This was granted and he then became the sixth player to sign with the Dragons in April 2006.  It is viewed that he will serve primarily as a back-up to Shane Heal.

References

1981 births
Living people
Australian men's basketball players
Portland Pilots men's basketball players
South Dragons players
Basketball players from Melbourne
Townsville Crocodiles players
Guards (basketball)
AdamQuick.com